Hasanak may refer to:
Hasanak the Vizier (c. 995-1032), a vizier of the Persian Empire
Hasanak, Razavi Khorasan, a village in Razavi Khorasan Province, Iran
Hasanak, alternate name of Hasanabad, Nasrabad, Razavi Khorasan Province, Iran